Michael Washington Lane is an antihero character appearing in American comic books published by DC Comics. He debuted in Batman #665 (June 2007) as the supervillain Bat-Devil, before later taking on the identity of Azrael, being the second character to do so, after Jean-Paul Valley.   

In the DC Universe, Michael Lane is a former US Marine, GCPD officer, and devout Christian who was inducted into a secret program, jointed between the military and the GCPD, into creating a replacement for Batman in the event the hero is killed in action, and became a sleeper agent. Due to the experimentations done upon him, as well as various tragedies in his life and PTSD, he becomes more violent in his duties as a cop and is eventually dismissed. This event completely breaks Lane's psyche, and he goes insane, becoming Bat-Devil to exact revenge on Batman, whom he blames for his current state. After recovering, Lane is selected by the Order of Purity, a splinter faction of the Order of St. Dumas which disagrees with their method of enforcing their rules and faith, to becomes their own version of the warrior Azrael. As Azrael, he clashes with Nightwing and later Batman after the latter's supposed death. Eventually, Lane progresses through his mental illnesses and manipulations from both the Order of Purity and Ra's al Ghul, and becomes a deputized member of Batman Incorporated. 

The Michael Lane version of Azrael has made several appearances in media, most notably in the Batman: Arkham game series, where he is voiced by Khary Payton.

Publication history
Michael Lane was introduced as Azrael as part of the Battle for the Cowl, a storyline told in a three-issue miniseries format written by Fabian Nicieza.

Fictional character biography
In 2009, a miniseries titled Azrael: Death's Dark Knight was produced as a tie-in to the Battle for the Cowl crossover event, with a later regular series.

The new Azrael is the Third "Ghost of Batman" to undergo Doctor Hurt's experiments, an ex-cop named Michael Washington Lane. He is approached by the Order of Purity to reclaim the mantle of Azrael after the Order's latest Azrael went mad and killed an undercover police officer. On his first night as Azrael, Lane fights Talia al Ghul (and her team of mercenaries led by Merlyn) and later encounters Nightwing. After convincing Nightwing that he was not responsible for the murder of the police officer, Nightwing persuades Talia to allow Michael to keep the Suit of Sorrows. In Batman and the Outsiders (vol. 2) #14, the character is displayed as a charming man who undergoes various purification rituals overseen by the Order of Purity.

Ra's al Ghul later attempts to manipulate Lane into destroying Gotham by having him commit suicide and be subsequently resurrected by the Suit, which had been dipped in a Lazarus Pit. Lane worked with metahuman Crusader to 'judge' Batman, Catwoman, and Red Robin for their past 'sins' to determine if Gotham should be saved. These included the insane obsession of Selina's sister that Selina is 'possessed', Robin not showing due reverence when he destroyed a church window to save hostages, and a childhood incident where Dick let another circus performer get assaulted because he was jealous. Although Lane is manipulated into perceiving the Bat-Family as having failed his tests, Batman convinces Lane to use his swords to test himself, revealing Ra's' plan in time for Lane to stop the planned destruction of new metahuman Fireball. Ra's intended for Azrael to detonate Fireball and make it appear as though Gotham had been destroyed by terrorists, inciting a wave of violence that would cleanse Earth and allow Ra's to take control.

Michael Lane has also appeared in The New 52. He was originally featured in Batwoman issue #2 as a cameo, which was written before the relaunch but published after; the art was however edited to remove him.

Skills, abilities, and equipment 
Unlike the first Azrael, Michael has no inherent superpowers. Due to his advanced military and police training, Michael is considered an excellent hand-to-hand combatant and is a skilled swordsman. In the past, Michael was also an accomplished football player and athlete.

Equipment 
The Suit of Sorrows, a cursed mystical armor, affords him several powers by granting him superhuman physical attributes the skills and memories of previous bearers. The suit is also highly durable, able to protect the bearer from rocket launchers and is bulletproof. It can also stimulate the effects of a Lazarus Pit and revive Michael within 3 days of death should he still have on the armor.

The Suit of Sorrows grants Lane superhuman physical attributes but at the potential expense of his sanity, becoming more violent while wearing it should he not be "pure". He also wields the Swords of Salvation and Sin, both magical swords able to induce mental images into a victims or the bearer's mind over certain "truths" (Salvation) and certain actions people have guilt over (Sin). When both wielded, they're potentially able to make a victim seek redemption. Due to their magical nature, they're able to cut through an opponent without leaving a physical mark.

In other media

Video games
 Michael Lane appears as a playable character in the handheld versions of Lego Batman 2: DC Super Heroes.
 Michael Lane appears as an assist character in Scribblenauts Unmasked: A DC Comics Adventure.

Batman: Arkham 

The Michael Lane incarnation of Azrael appears in the Batman: Arkham series, voiced by Khary Payton:
 Azrael first appears in Batman: Arkham City, as the focus of the "Watcher in the Wings" side mission. After certain events in the game's main storyline, he can be seen on the rooftops of various buildings in Arkham City, watching over Batman. When approached, Azrael will disappear in a cloud of smoke, leaving a symbol for Batman to scan. After scanning all the symbols and combining them to reveal a location, Batman meets Azrael, who tells him about the Order of St. Dumas and warns him of their prophecy of future events and the Dark Knight's end. Though Batman doubts this, Azrael tells him that, regardless of his belief, there are parts of it that are becoming true and they will meet again, before disappearing into a cloud of smoke.
 Azrael returns in Batman: Arkham Knight as the focus of the Most Wanted mission, "Heir to the Cowl", during which he is briefly playable. The character was later made fully playable in the game's challenge maps through an update. During Scarecrow's takeover of Gotham, Azrael contacts Batman to become his successor. Batman puts Azrael through several trials to test his abilities, during which he is unknowingly monitored by Alfred Pennyworth. After all the trials are completed, Alfred reveals that Azrael's fighting style is identical to Batman's, implying that he has been observing him for years. After discovering Azrael's true identity and that the Order of St. Dumas have implanted a microchip in his brain, Batman goes to the clock tower hideout to analyze the chip. The analysis reveals that the Order have been subtly controlling Azrael's actions, and plan for him to kill Batman, whose moral code prevents criminals from facing "true justice", and become Gotham's sole protector. Azrael then appears behind Batman, revealing that he had been listening to his and Alfred's conversation. Now aware that the Order have manipulated him, he is torn between completing his mission to eliminate Batman or regaining his free will.
 If the player chooses to have Azrael attempt to kill Batman, he is quickly subdued and subsequently incarcerated at the GCPD Headquarters, vowing to escape and complete his mission one day.
 If the player chooses to have Azrael leave the clock tower or destroy his sword, he breaks free of the Order's brainwashing and vows to exact revenge on them.

References

External links
 World of Black Heroes: Azrael Michael Washington Lane Biography
 Azrael (Michael Lane) at the DC Database Project

2007 comics debuts
African-American superheroes
Batman characters
Characters created by Grant Morrison
DC Comics characters with superhuman strength
DC Comics characters who can move at superhuman speeds
DC Comics martial artists
DC Comics metahumans
DC Comics supervillains
DC Comics male supervillains
DC Comics male superheroes
DC Comics military personnel
DC Comics titles
Fictional characters with dissociative identity disorder
Fictional assassins in comics
Fictional members of secret societies
Fictional swordfighters in comics
Fictional knights
Fictional United States Marine Corps personnel
Gotham City Police Department officers
Vigilante characters in comics